Robert Strombachs (born 15 September 1999) is a Latvian-German tennis player.

Strombachs has a career high ATP singles ranking of 535 achieved on 5 August 2019. He also has a career high ATP doubles ranking of 383 achieved on 19 August 2019.

Strombachs represents Latvia at the Davis Cup, where he has a W/L record of 1–0.

Future and Challenger finals

Singles: 8 (5–3)

Doubles 16 (7–9)

References

External links

1999 births
Living people
German male tennis players
Latvian male tennis players
Tennis players from Berlin
German people of Latvian descent